Eighty Four is a census-designated place in Somerset, Nottingham, North Strabane, and South Strabane townships in Washington County, Pennsylvania, United States. It lies approximately 25 miles (40 km) southwest of Pittsburgh and is in the Pittsburgh metropolitan area.  The population was 657 at the 2010 census.

Eighty Four contains the 84 Lumber company's headquarters. Eighty Four is a part of the Canon-McMillan, Trinity, Ringgold, and Bentworth school districts.

Eighty Four is accessible via Pennsylvania Route 519 and Route 136 and interstates 79 and 70. The closest international airport is the Pittsburgh International Airport approximately 25 miles northwest of Eighty Four in Findlay Township.

Demographics

Origin of name 

Eighty Four was originally named Smithville. Due to postal confusion with another town of the same name, its name was changed to "Eighty Four" on July 28, 1884. The origin of the name is uncertain. It has been suggested that the town was named in honor of Grover Cleveland's 1884 election as President of the United States, but that occurred after the town was named. Another possibility is the town's mile marker on the Baltimore & Ohio Railroad. Another is that the town was named after the year the town's post office was built, by a postmaster who "didn't have a whole lot of imagination."

See also
 List of places with numeric names

References 

Census-designated places in Washington County, Pennsylvania